Michel Bensoussan (born 5 January 1954) is a French former professional footballer who played as a goalkeeper. He was a member of the French squad that won the gold medal at the 1984 Summer Olympics in Los Angeles, California, United States. During his career, he notably played for Paris Saint-Germain, Paris FC, Rouen, and Caen.

References

External links
Profile

1954 births
Living people
Sportspeople from Pau, Pyrénées-Atlantiques
French footballers
Jewish French sportspeople
Pau FC players
Paris Saint-Germain F.C. players
Paris FC players
FC Rouen players
Stade Malherbe Caen players
Footballers at the 1984 Summer Olympics
Olympic footballers of France
Association football goalkeepers
Olympic medalists in football
Ligue 1 players
Medalists at the 1984 Summer Olympics
Olympic gold medalists for France
Footballers from Nouvelle-Aquitaine